Two submarines of the French Navy have borne the name Phoque:

 , a  launched in 1904 and stricken in 1914
 , a  launched in 1926, acquired by Italy in 1942 and sunk in 1943

French Navy ship names